Bloodstone may refer to:
Heliotrope (mineral) or bloodstone, a form of chalcedony

Film
Bloodstone (1988 film), an Indian-American action/comedy film
Bloodstone: Subspecies II, a 1993 horror film
Bloodstone: An Epic Dwarven Tale, another 1993 movie

Gaming
"Bloodstone", a region in at least one of the "Fable" games by Lionhead Studios
Bloodstone: An Epic Dwarven Tale, a 1993 video game by Mindcraft Software, Inc.
James Bond 007: Blood Stone, a 2010 video game
Bloodstone, an item in the video game series Defense of the Ancients
Bloodstone Lands, a kingdom in the Forgotten Realms Dungeons & Dragons setting

Music
 Bloodstone (band), an R&B, soul and funk band
 Bloodstone (Russell Morris album), 1971
 Bloodstone (Bloodstone album), 1972
 "Bloodstone" (Guy Sebastian song), 2017
 "Bloodstone", a 1982 song by Judas Priest from Screaming for Vengeance
 "Bloodstone", a 2007 song by Amon Tobin from Foley Room

Other uses
Operation Bloodstone, a CIA recruitment program for former Nazi officers and diplomats who could be used in the covert intelligence operations against the Soviet Union
Ulysses Bloodstone, a Marvel Comics character
Elsa Bloodstone, his daughter
Cullen Bloodstone, his son
Bloodstone, a novel by Karl Edward Wagner

See also
Bloodstone (comics), a set index of comics topics